The rufous-faced antbird (Myrmelastes rufifacies) is a species of bird in the family Thamnophilidae. It is found in humid forest in the Brazilian Amazon south of the Amazon River and east of the Madeira River.

The rufous-faced antbird was previously considered as a subspecies of the spot-winged antbird. A 2007 study of the vocal characteristics found that there were significant differences between the taxa and based on this evidence the rufous-faced antbird was promoted to species status. As presently defined, the rufous-faced antbird is monotypic.

The conservation status of the rufous-faced antbird has been assessed by BirdLife International to be of Least Concern.

References

rufous-faced antbird
Birds of the Brazilian Amazon
Endemic birds of Brazil
rufous-faced antbird